The Peruvian cotton rat (Sigmodon peruanus) is a species of rodent in the family Cricetidae.
It is found in Ecuador and Peru.

References

Musser, G. G. and M. D. Carleton. 2005. Superfamily Muroidea. pp. 894–1531 in Mammal Species of the World a Taxonomic and Geographic Reference. D. E. Wilson and D. M. Reeder eds. Johns Hopkins University Press, Baltimore.

Cotton rats
Mammals described in 1897
Taxonomy articles created by Polbot